JNJ-28330835 is a drug which acts as a selective androgen receptor modulator (SARM). In studies on rats it was found to enhance muscle growth and sexual behavior but with minimal effects on prostate gland size. A number of related compounds are known, though JNJ-28330835 has progressed furthest through development.

See also 
 Enobosarm
 GSK2881078
 Ligandrol
 LY-2452473

References 

Selective androgen receptor modulators